In mathematics, two functions are said to be topologically conjugate  if there exists a homeomorphism that will conjugate the one into the other. Topological conjugacy, and related-but-distinct  of flows, are important in the study of iterated functions and more generally dynamical systems, since, if the dynamics of one iterative function can be determined, then that for a topologically conjugate function follows trivially.

Then one must have 

and so the iterated systems are topologically conjugate as well. Here,  denotes function composition.

Definition

 being topologically semiconjugate to   means, by definition, that  is a surjection such that .

Flows

 being topologically semiconjugate to  means, by definition, that  is a surjection such that , for each , .

Examples
 The logistic map and the tent map are topologically conjugate.
 The logistic map of unit height and the Bernoulli map are topologically conjugate.
 For certain values in the parameter space, the Hénon map when restricted to its Julia set is topologically conjugate or semi-conjugate to the shift map on the space of two-sided sequences in two symbols.

Discussion
This equivalence relation is very useful in the theory of dynamical systems, since each class contains all functions which share the same dynamics from the topological viewpoint. Writing  makes this fact evident:  . Speaking informally, topological conjugation is a "change of coordinates" in the topological sense.

However, the analogous definition for flows is somewhat restrictive. This motivates the definition of topological equivalence, which also partitions the set of all flows in  into classes of flows sharing the same dynamics, again from the topological viewpoint.

Topological equivalence
In other words, letting  denote an orbit, one has

for each . In addition, one must line up the flow of time: for each , there exists a  such that, if , and if   is such that , then .

Overall, topological equivalence is a weaker equivalence criterion than topological conjugacy, as it does not require that the time term is mapped along with the orbits and their orientation. An example of a topologically equivalent but not topologically conjugate system would be the non-hyperbolic class of two dimensional systems of differential equations that have closed orbits. While the orbits can be transformed to each other to overlap in the spatial sense, the periods of such systems cannot be analogously matched, thus failing to satisfy the topological conjugacy criterion while satisfying the topological equivalence criterion.

Smooth and orbital equivalence

In that case, the dynamical systems can be transformed into each other by the coordinate transformation, .

Orbitally equivalent system differ only in the time parametrization.

Systems that are smoothly equivalent or orbitally equivalent are also topologically equivalent. However, the reverse is not true. For example, consider linear systems in two dimensions of the form . If the matrix, has two positive real eigenvalues, the system has an unstable node; if the matrix has two complex eigenvalues with positive real part, the system has an unstable focus (or spiral). Nodes and foci are topologically equivalent but not orbitally equivalent or smoothly equivalent, because their eigenvalues are different (notice that the Jacobians of two locally smoothly equivalent systems must be similar, so their eigenvalues, as well as algebraic and geometric multiplicities, must be equal).

Generalizations of dynamic topological conjugacy
There are two reported extensions of the concept of dynamic topological conjugacy:
 Analogous systems defined as isomorphic dynamical systems
 Adjoint dynamical systems defined via adjoint functors and natural equivalences in categorical dynamics.

See also
Commutative diagram

References

Topological dynamics
Homeomorphisms